Live in Concert is the first live concert CD and DVD from country music superstar Martina McBride. The show was recorded September 29, 2007 at the iWireless Center in Moline, Illinois during McBride's Waking Up Laughing Tour. The concert was originally taped for a PBS Great Performances special that aired during the month of March 2008.

Track listing
Disc 1 – Live CD

Disc 2 – Live DVD

Charts

Album

References
[ Martina McBride: Live in Concert] at AllMusic

Martina McBride albums
Live video albums
2008 live albums
2008 video albums
RCA Records live albums
RCA Records video albums